Casanova's Legacy (German: Casanovas Erbe) is a 1928 German silent film directed by Manfred Noa and starring Andrée Lafayette, Maly Delschaft and Elizza La Porta.

The film's sets were designed by the art director Alexander Ferenczy.

Cast
 Andrée Lafayette 
 Maly Delschaft 
 Elizza La Porta 
 Yvette Darnys 
 Harry Hardt
 John Loder 
 Kurt Gerron 
 Louis Ralph
 Olga Belajeff

References

Bibliography
 Bock, Hans-Michael & Bergfelder, Tim. The Concise CineGraph. Encyclopedia of German Cinema. Berghahn Books, 2009.

External links

1928 films
Films of the Weimar Republic
Films directed by Manfred Noa
German silent feature films
Bavaria Film films
German black-and-white films